Marian Bell (married name Marian Aylmore) (born 4 August 1958 at Cowaramup, Western Australia) is a former Australian field hockey player.  Bell played in 50 international matches for Australia.

She captained the Australian team 10 times to 1983, including the Hockey World Cup before temporarily retiring to prepare for the birth of her daughter.  After a break of just five months she competed at the 1984 Olympics in Los Angeles.

Bell was inducted into the Western Australian Hall of Champions in 1992.

References

External links
 

1958 births
Australian female field hockey players
Olympic field hockey players of Australia
People from the South West (Western Australia)
Living people
Field hockey people from Western Australia
Western Australian Institute of Sport alumni
Field hockey players at the 1984 Summer Olympics